The Death of Britain is a 1999 book by John Redwood in which he explores the constitutional crises facing Britain via reforms implemented by the incumbent Labour government, such as devolution and House of Lords reform.

Editions
Palgrave Macmillan, January 1999, 
St. Martin's Press, July 1999,

References

1999 non-fiction books
Books about politics of the United Kingdom
1999 in British politics
Palgrave Macmillan books
St. Martin's Press books